Craig Williams (born 14 August 1954) is a former Australian rules footballer who played a season with  in the VFL. He also played for West Adelaide in the SANFL for the entire 1980s.

Career

VFL
St Kilda recruited Williams from Victorian Football Association (VFA) club Prahran and he played eight games in the 1977 VFL season. He left St Kilda at the end of the year and crossed to  but failed to make the seniors again, spending two years with Fitzroy's reserves.

SANFL
Williams moved to South Australia in 1980 where he joined West Adelaide and would be a regular fixture in their side for the rest of the decade. Under legendary coach Neil Kerley, Williams was a member of West's 1983 premiership side that defeated Sturt. He started the 1983 SANFL Grand Final in the Forward pocket and had stints in the ruck throughout the game. During the second quarter of the game at Football Park Williams dislocated the Ring finger on his left hand which was said to be "at right angles to where it should be". Despite this, Williams returned to the game in the 2nd half and helped The Bloods win their first (and so far only) premiership since 1961.

Williams is regarded as having his best game of club football in Round 21 of the 1982 season when West Adelaide defeated Sturt by 2 points at the Adelaide Oval. Playing Fullback on champion Sturt Full-forward/ruckman Rick Davies, it was expected that Davies would take his usual number of marks and kick a few goals. By the end of the match Davies had failed to take a mark opposed to Williams who played from in front of the "Jumbo Prince" and didn't give an inch in body contests. For his efforts Williams was judged best on ground.

Craig Williams retired following the 1989 SANFL season in which West Adelaide failed to make the finals. He played a total of 160 games for The Bloods and kicked 50 goals.

Interstate Football
Williams represented South Australia in State of Origin and won the Fos Williams Medal for his performance at fullback against Western Australia at Subiaco Oval (Perth) in 1983. This performance also saw Williams selected as an All-Australian that year.

References

1954 births
Living people
Australian rules footballers from Victoria (Australia)
Prahran Football Club players
St Kilda Football Club players
West Adelaide Football Club players
South Australian State of Origin players
All-Australians (1953–1988)